is a Japanese molecular biologist and computer scientist, best known as the director of the E-Cell simulation environment software and/or the inventor of GLR parser algorithm. He is a professor of Keio University, president of the Institute for Advanced Biosciences, and the founder and board member of Human Metabolome Technologies, Inc. He is also the co-founder and on the board of directors of The Metabolomics Society. His father is composer Isao Tomita.

From Oct. 2005 to Sep. 2007, he served as Dean of Faculty of Environment and Information Studies, Keio University.

He received an M.S. (1983) and a Ph.D. (1985) in computer science from Carnegie Mellon University (CMU) under Jaime Carbonell, and two other doctoral degrees in electronic engineering and molecular biology from Kyoto University (1994) and Keio University (1998).

At CMU, starting in 1985, Dr. Tomita achieved a series of academic promotions from assistant professor to associate professor of computer science and from 1986 he became an associate director of the Center for Machine Translation.

In 1990, he returned to Keio University, Japan, and served as associate professor until 1997. At Keio University, he shifted his research emphasis to the studies of molecular biology and systems biology.

Dr. Tomita is a recipient of the Presidential Young Investigator Award from the National Science Foundation of the USA (1988), an IBM Japan Science Prize (2002), an IBM Shared University Research Award (2003), a Minister of Science and Technology Policy Award (2004), and The Commendation for Science and Technology by the Minister of Education, Culture, Sports, Science and Technology (2007).

Selected papers 
"Building Working Cells 'in Silico'", Science 1999; 284-5411:80 - 81
"Going for Grand Challenges", Nature 1999; 402:C70
"E-CELL: Software environment for whole cell simulation", Bioinformatics 1999; 15:72-84
"Computerized role models: Japan's push to create a virtual cell signals a new approach to research", Nature 2002; 417
"Multiple high-throughput analyses monitor the response of E. coli to perturbations", Science 2007; 316:593-7

References

External links 
 Institute for Advanced Biosciences, Keio University
 Human Metabolome Technologies, Inc.
 The E-Cell Project
 The Metabolomics Society

Living people
Carnegie Mellon University alumni
Keio University alumni
Japanese computer scientists
Japanese molecular biologists
1957 births